The Lens placode is a thickened portion of ectoderm that serves as the precursor to the lens.

SOX2 and Pou2f1 are involved in its development.

See also
 Placode

References

External links
 
 https://web.archive.org/web/20071213145329/http://cwx.prenhall.com/bookbind/pubbooks/martini10/chapter18/custom3/deluxe-content.html
 https://web.archive.org/web/20070912010420/http://isc.temple.edu/neuroanatomy/lab/embryo_new/eye/2/

Embryology of nervous system
Eye